Folketing elections were held in Denmark on 6 July 1920, except in the Faroe Islands, where they were held on 3 August. The result was a victory for Venstre, which won 51 of the 140 seats. Voter turnout was 74.9% in Denmark proper and 46.4% in the Faroe Islands.

Results

References

2020 07
Denmark
Folketing 2
Denmark